Octotiamine (INN, JAN; Gerostop, Neuvita, Neuvitan), also known as thioctothiamine, is an analogue of vitamin B1 which is used in Japan and Finland.

See also
 Vitamin B1 analogue

References

Thiamine